Vinesh Phogat (born 25 August 1994) is an Indian wrestler. She became the first Indian woman wrestler to win gold in both Commonwealth and Asian Games. She is the only Indian woman wrestler to win multiple medals at the World Wrestling Championships. Phogat became the first Indian athlete to be nominated for Laureus World Sports Awards in 2019.

Phogat comes from a successful family of wrestlers, with her cousins  and  being international wrestlers and Commonwealth Games medalists as well.

Personal life and family

Vinesh is the daughter of wrestler Rajpal Phogat and cousin of wrestlers Geetha and Babita. Both her cousins have won gold in 55 kg category in Commonwealth Games.

In allowing her cousins and herself to pursue competitive wrestling, her father and uncle had to deal with immense pressure and opposition from the community in their village in Haryana. They were adjudged as going against the morals and values of their community. Her cousin, Ritu Phogat, too is an international level wrestler and has won a gold medal at the 2016 Commonwealth Wrestling Championship.

On 13 December 2018, she married her long-time boyfriend and fellow wrestler Somvir Rathee of Bakhta Khera village of Jind district, who is a two times gold medalist in the national championship. The couple knew each other since 2011 and both work for the Indian Railways where they met and fell in love.

She suffered a career-threatening anterior cruciate ligament tear in her knee at the Rio Olympics.

Career
In world championship 2019, she bagged her maiden world championship medal (Bronze). She bagged Gold in Asian Games and Commonwealth Games in 2018 came in the 50 kg category. In Matteo Pellicone Ranking Series in Rome, the 26 years old crushed Canada's Diana Mary Helen Weicker 4–0 in the 53 kg final.

2013 Asian Wrestling Championships
In 2013 Asian Wrestling Championships in New Delhi, India, Vinesh won the bronze medal in the women's freestyle 52 kg category, winning 3:0 in the bronze medal bout through the repechage round to Tho-Kaew Sriprapa of Thailand.

In the first round, Vinesh won 3:1 against Nanami Irie of Japan. She then lost 1:3 in the quarter-finals to Tatyana Amanzhol of Kazakhstan who qualified for the final thus qualifying the Indian grappler for the repechage round.

2013 Commonwealth Wrestling Championships
In an exclusive tournament held in Johannesburg, South Africa, Vinesh finished second and won the silver medal in the women's freestyle 51 kg category, losing in the final round to Odunayo Adekuoroye of Nigeria.

2014 Commonwealth Games
Vinesh represented India in the women's freestyle 48 kg category at the 2014 Commonwealth Games in Glasgow, and won the gold medal.

In the quarter-finals, Vinesh faced Rosemary Nweke of Nigeria and beat her 5–0. Her semi-finals opponent was Jasmine Mian of Canada whom she beat 4–1. In the gold medal bout, she faced home favourite Yana Rattigan of England and won the gold medal, beating her 3–1.

2014 Asian Games
At 2014 Asian Games in Incheon, South Korea, Vinesh won the bronze medal in the women's freestyle 48 kg category.

In the Round of 16, Vinesh faced Yongmi Pak from the People's Republic of Korea and beat her 3:1. Her quarter-finals opponent was Dauletbike Yakhshimuratova of Uzbekistan whom she overcame easily with a 5:0 scoreline. She lost 1:3 in the semi-finals to Eri Tosaka of Japan but qualified for the bronze medal bout and beat Narangerel Eredenesukh of Mongolia to win 10-0 easily after referee stopped the bout (classification points 4:0).

2015–2017
At the 2015 Asian Championships in Doha, Phogat won the silver medal in her category after losing the final to Yuki Irie of Japan. In the qualifying tournament for the 2016 Rio Olympics held in Istanbul, she won in the final round beating Polish wrestler Iwona Matkowska, and qualified for the Olympics in the process.

At the 2016 Summer Olympics in Rio, Vinesh reached the Quarter Finals and lost to Sun Yanan of China owing to a knee injury.

2018 Gold Coast CommonWealth Games
Vinesh Phogat won the gold medal in women's 50 kg freestyle wrestling at 2018 Commonwealth Games in Gold Coast.

2018 Asian Games
Vinesh Phogat won the gold medal at the 2018 Asian Games and became first Indian woman wrestler to win gold in the Asian Games. Phogat beat Japan's Yuki Irie in Women's 50 kg Freestyle Wrestling gold medal match 6–2.

2019 Asian Wrestling Championships
Vinesh won the bronze medal in 2019 Asian Wrestling Championships by defeating World Championships bronze medallist Qianyu Pang of China.

2019 Yasar Dogu International 
Phogat won gold in the 2019 Yasar Dogu International by defeating Ekaterina Poleshchuk of Russia.

2019 Poland Open wrestling tournament 
Vinesh Phogat bagged her third consecutive gold in women's 53 kg category after winning the Poland Open wrestling tournament in Warsaw.

2019 World Wrestling Championships 
Vinesh Phogat bagged a maiden World Championship medal in the women's 53 kg category after pinning Maria Prevolaraki in the Bronze medal match. She became the first Indian wrestler to qualify for the Tokyo Olympics 2020 by virtue of her top six finish.

2020 season

In January 2020, Phogat won gold in Rome Ranking Series, defeating Luisa Elizabeth Valverde (4-0).

2021 season

2021 Outstanding Ukrainian Wrestlers and Coaches Memorial tournament 

Vinesh Phogat defeated 2017 world champion Vanesa Kaladzinskay to win the gold medal in February 2021 at the tournament held in Kiev.

Vinesh opened up a 4–0 lead in the 53 kg final with a throw which she initiated with a left-leg attack but Kaladzinskay made it 4–4 with her brilliant move.

Vinesh took the break leading 6–4, adding to her score with a takedown, 10 seconds before the break.

The Belarusian put pressure on the Indian with another four-point throw but with 25 seconds to go, Vinesh's move fetched her four more points for a 10–8 lead. She got into a position from where she pinned Kaladzinskay to ensure herself a gold.

Since the coronavirus halted all competitions in 2020, it was the first competition for Vinesh in 2021, who is the only Indian woman wrestler to have qualified for the Tokyo Games.

2021 Matteo Pellicone Ranking Series event 

Vinesh Phogat won her second gold medal in as many weeks with a dominant win in the event and reclaimed the top rank in the her category.
Vinesh blanked Canada's Diana Mary Helen Weicker 4-0 where she scored all her points in the first period and held on to her lead in the second to ensure a top-of-the-podium finish.

The Indian had entered the event as world number three but is back to world number one by jumping 14 points. The Canadian was ranked as low as 40 before the tournament but is now just behind Vinesh at number two.

Vinesh did not concede a single point at this tournament, winning two of her three bouts by pinning her rivals while getting injury walkouts in the other two in the eight-woman field.

2021 Poland Open wrestling tournament 
Vinesh Phogat won the gold medal in the women's 53 kg event at the 2021 Poland Open.

She competed in the women's 53 kg event at the 2020 Summer Olympics.

2022 

She won the gold medal in the women's 53 kg event at the 2022 Commonwealth Games held in Birmingham, England. She won one of the bronze medals in the 53 kg event at the 2022 World Wrestling Championships held in Belgrade, Serbia.

She also won the BBC Indian Sportswoman Of The Year award for 2022.

Record against opponents

International Competition

Summer Olympic Games

World Championship

Asian Games

Commonwealth Games

Asian Wrestling Championship

Honors
Major Dhyan Chand Khel Ratna- Highest sports honour in India, winner in 2020 .
 Arjuna Award, winner in 2016.
 Padma Shri, nominee in 2018 by the Sports Authority of India.

See also
 Akhara

References

External links
 

Living people
Indian female sport wrestlers
Sportswomen from Haryana
Commonwealth Games gold medallists for India
Commonwealth Games medallists in wrestling
Wrestlers at the 2014 Commonwealth Games
Wrestlers at the 2018 Commonwealth Games
Wrestlers at the 2022 Commonwealth Games
Wrestlers at the 2014 Asian Games
Wrestlers at the 2018 Asian Games
Asian Games medalists in wrestling
1994 births
Wrestlers at the 2016 Summer Olympics
Olympic wrestlers of India
Asian Games gold medalists for India
Asian Games bronze medalists for India
21st-century Indian women
21st-century Indian people
Medalists at the 2014 Asian Games
Medalists at the 2018 Asian Games
Female sport wrestlers from Haryana
Vinesh
World Wrestling Championships medalists
Recipients of the Khel Ratna Award
Recipients of the Arjuna Award
Asian Wrestling Championships medalists
Wrestlers at the 2020 Summer Olympics
Medallists at the 2014 Commonwealth Games
Medallists at the 2018 Commonwealth Games
Medallists at the 2022 Commonwealth Games